Skaar Ridge is a ridge on the southeast side of Mount Augusta in Queen Alexandra Range. It trends southeast for 2 nautical miles (3.7 km) to Beardmore Glacier. This area was first sighted by Shackleton's Southern Journey Party in 1908. The ridge is the site of the only known (1971) Permian peat deposit of Gondwana, discovered here by James M. Schopf of the Ohio State University Geological Expedition, 1969–70. Named for Lieutenant Gerhard E. Skaar, U.S. Navy, who piloted the helicopter that took Schopf to the locality and subsequent discovery.

Ridges of the Ross Dependency
Shackleton Coast